Luis Moreno (Moreno Fernandez) (Madrid, 1950-2023) was a journalist, sociologist, and political scientist. He was an Emeritus Research Professor at the Spanish National Research Council (CSIC).

Academic Bio 

Graduate of the Universidad Complutense (Madrid), he was awarded his Ph.D. in Social Sciences at the University of Edinburgh. He has been visiting scholar at the universities of Colorado (CU-Boulder), Denver (DU), Edinburgh and Rome (La Sapienza) and the Institute for Research on Population and Social Policies (Italian National Research Council, CNR). He was Jean Monnet Senior Research Fellow at the European University Institute in Florence.
 
In Spain he was an invited professor at the Centro de Estudios Políticos y Constitucionales and the Universidad Internacional Menendez Pelayo.

Two are his long-standing lines of research: (a) Social policy and welfare state, and (b) Territorial politics (decentralization, federalism, nationalism and Europeanization). Both have been carried out from a comparative perspective. He has analysed the different ages of welfare development, and has also conceptualized the Mediterranean welfare regime within the European Social Model.

In his 1986 PhD dissertation he introduced in the Anglo-Saxon academic world what is known as ‘the Moreno Question’, by which a self-identification scale expressed by citizens in Scotland was meant to clarify social mobilization in the quest for political autonomy (‘Only Scottish, not British’; ‘More Scottish than British’; ‘Equally Scottish as British’; ‘More British than Scottish’; and ‘Only British, not Scottish).

He has been director of more than 20 research projects awarded by competitive sources by Spanish and European institutions. He has (co) authored nearly 30 books and more than 300 scientific texts. According to Google Scholar, he is the Spanish sociologist and political scientist most cited internationally.

His essay books, ‘Europe without States‘(2014), ‘Triennium of Changes‘ (2015), ‘Hazardous Societies’ (2017), and ‘Robotized democracies’ (& Raul Jimenez, 2018) analyse the changing times in Spain, Europe and the world. His latest book, ‘Behind Closed Doors. Views on Life Changes’ (& Raul Jimenez, 2021) deals with social effects induced by the Covid-19 pandemic.

Profiles and academic links 
 CSIC (IPP-CCHS)
 Academia.edu
 ResearchGate
 Google Scholar 
 ORCID

Libraries and repositories 
 CSIC Library
 Digital CSIC
 Library of Congress
 La Catarata
 Siglo XXI
 Centro de Estudios Políticos y Constitucionales
 Península
 Aracne

Op-Eds and Blogs 
 Op-Eds, articles of opinion
 LSE Europp
 Centre on Constitutional Change
 EuVisions

References

Spanish political scientists
Spanish sociologists
Alumni of the University of Edinburgh